Lakeland Airport , also known as Noble F. Lee Memorial Field, is a public airport near Arbor Vitae, a town in Vilas County, Wisconsin, United States. The airport is three miles (5 km) northwest of the central business district of Minocqua and northwest of Woodruff, both cities in Oneida County, just south of the Vilas County border. It is included in the Federal Aviation Administration (FAA) National Plan of Integrated Airport Systems for 2021–2025, in which it is categorized as a local general aviation facility. It is owned by the Lakeland Airport Commission.

Facilities and aircraft 
The airport contains two asphalt paved runways: 18/36 measuring 5,150 x 100 ft (1,570 x 30 m) with approved LOC and GPS approaches and 10/28 measuring 3,602 x 75 ft (1,098 x 23 m) with approved GPS and NDB approaches. The Arbor Vitae NDB navaid, (ARV) frequency 221 kHz, is located on the field.

For the 12-month period ending August 20, 2020, the airport had 27,190 aircraft operations, an average of 74 per day: 88% general aviation, 12% air taxi and less than 1% military. In February 2023, there were 24 aircraft based at this airport: 22 single-engine and 2 multi-engine.

Incidents
On May 25, 2003, at 1754 central daylight time, a Piper PA-31P Pressurized Navajo crashed and was destroyed by fire after takeoff from the airport's Runway 36. All four occupants were killed.
On September 12, 2008, a Cirrus SR22 arriving from General Mitchell International Airport crashed about a half mile southwest of the airport. All three people on board died.

See also 
 List of airports in Wisconsin

References

External links 
Lakeland-Noble F. Lee Memorial Field (ARV) at Wisconsin Department of Transportation
Lakeland Aviation of Minocqua, Inc. (Fixed-Base Operator at Lakeland Airport, Arbor Vitae, Wisconsin) - Owner: T.A. Solberg. Manager, Angie Bishop.

Airports in Wisconsin
Buildings and structures in Vilas County, Wisconsin